The second cabinet of Gheorghe Grigore Cantacuzino was the government of Romania from 22 December 1904 to 12 March 1907.

Ministers
The ministers of the cabinet were as follows:

President of the Council of Ministers:
Gheorghe Grigore Cantacuzino (22 December 1904 - 12 March 1907)
Minister of the Interior: 
Gheorghe Grigore Cantacuzino (22 December 1904 - 12 March 1907)
Minister of Foreign Affairs: 
Gen. Iacob Lahovari (22 December 1904 - 9 February 1907)
(interim) Ion Lahovari (9 - 26 February 1907)
Ion Lahovari (26 February - 12 March 1907)
Minister of Finance:
Take Ionescu (22 December 1904 - 12 March 1907)
Minister of Justice:
Alexandru A. Bădărău (22 December 1904 - 15 June 1906)
Dimitrie Greceanu (15 June 1906 - 12 March 1907)
Minister of War:
Gen. George Manu (22 December 1904 - 12 March 1907)
Minister of Religious Affairs and Public Instruction:
Mihail Vlădescu (22 December 1904 - 24 October 1906)
Constantin G. Dissescu (24 October 1906 - 26 February 1907)
Constantin Istrati (26 February - 12 March 1907)
Minister of Agriculture, Industry, Commerce, and Property:
Ion Lahovari (22 December 1904 - 26 February 1907)
(interim) Ion Lahovari (26 February - 12 March 1907)
Minister of Public Works:
Ion C. Grădișteanu (22 December 1904 - 12 March 1907)

References

Cabinets of Romania
Cabinets established in 1904
Cabinets disestablished in 1907
1904 establishments in Romania
1907 disestablishments in Romania